Frederick Williams may refer to:

Politicians
Sir Frederick Williams, 2nd Baronet, of Tregullow (1830–1878), English politician, Member of Parliament (MP) for Truro 1863–1878
Frederick W. Williams, Canadian politician

Others
Frederick A. Williams (1869–1942), American pianist and composer
Frederick C. Williams (1855–1940), president of the Chico, California Board of Trustees from 1895 to 1897
Frederick G. Williams (1787–1842), leader in The Church of Jesus Christ of Latter-day Saints
Sir Frederick William Williams, 5th Baronet, of Tregullow (1888–1913), see the Williams baronets
Sir Frederick Law Williams, 7th Baronet, of Tregullow (1862–1921), see the Williams baronets
Frederick Smeeton Williams (1829–1886), Congregational minister and railway historian
Frederic Calland Williams (1911–1977), known as Freddie Williams, English engineer
Frederic Newton Williams (1862–1923), English physician and botanist
Frederic Williams (businessman) (1854–1940), New Zealand business proprietor, company director and community leader
Frederick B. Williams (1939–2006), religious leader in the United States
Frederick Dickinson Williams (1829–1915), American landscape artist
Frederick Rotimi Williams (1920–2005), Nigerian lawyer
Frederick Williams (priest) (1826–1885), Anglican clergyman
Fred Williams (journalist), Canadian newspaper journalist, writer, and historian
Frederick Ballard Williams (1871–1956), American landscape and figure painter

See also
Frederick William (disambiguation)
Fred Williams (disambiguation)
Freddie Williams (disambiguation)